Citromycetin is a bio-active polyketide isolated from Australian Penicillium.

References 

Polyketide antibiotics
Citromycetin
Phenols
4-Pyrones
Carboxylic acids